Tucson is a city in the U.S. state of Arizona.

Tucson may also refer to:

Tucson, Ohio, an unincorporated community
Hyundai Tucson, an automobile
FC Tucson
, several ships
Tucson (film), a 1949 film
TusCon, an annual science fiction convention in Tucson, Arizona